The 1989 Texas A&M Aggies football team completed the season with an 8–4 record.  The Aggies had a regular season Southwest Conference record of 6–2.

Schedule

References

Texas AandM
Texas A&M Aggies football seasons
Texas AandM Aggies football